Leon Schlesinger (May 20, 1884 – December 25, 1949)  was an American film producer who founded Leon Schlesinger Productions, which later became the Warner Bros. Cartoons studio, during the Golden Age of American animation. He was a distant relative of the Warner Brothers. As head of his own studio, Schlesinger served as the producer of Warner's Looney Tunes and Merrie Melodies cartoons from 1930, when Schlesinger assumed production from his subcontractors, Harman and Ising, to 1944, when Warner acquired the studio.

Early life and career 
Schlesinger was born to a Jewish family in Philadelphia, Pennsylvania, on May 20, 1884. In 1909, Schlesinger married Bernice K. Schlesinger (nee Leona Katz) (September 15, 1882 – May 8, 1966). 

After Schlesinger worked at a theater as an usher, songbook agent, actor, and manager (including the Palace Theater in Buffalo, New York), he founded Pacific Title & Art Studio in 1919, where most of his business was producing title cards for silent films. As talking pictures ("talkies")  replaced them in 1929 and 1930, Schlesinger looked for ways to capitalize on the new technology and stay in business. Some film historians, like Tom Sito, claim that he helped finance the Warner Brothers' first talkie, The Jazz Singer (1927). He then secured a contract with the studio to produce its brand-new Looney Tunes series, and he signed animators Hugh Harman and Rudy Ising to create these cartoons with their Bosko character as the star.

Warner's Westerns 
Schlesinger produced six B-movie Westerns in the 1930s for Warners starring John Wayne.

 Haunted Gold (1932)
 Ride Him Cowboy (1932)
 The Big Stampede (1932)
 The Telegraph Trail (1933)
 Somewhere in Sonora (1933)
 The Man from Monterey (1933)

Schlesinger as businessman 
Schlesinger was a shrewd businessman with a keen eye for talent. When Harman and Ising left Warner Bros. with Bosko in 1933, Schlesinger set up his own studio on the Warner Bros. Sunset Boulevard lot at the corner of Van Ness and Fernwood. He wooed animators away from other studios, including some of those who had departed with Harman and Ising including Bob Clampett. One of these was Friz Freleng, whom Schlesinger promoted to oversee production of Looney Tunes and to develop the sister series, Merrie Melodies. Freleng's talent quickly shone through, and Schlesinger's hiring of Robert McKimson, Tex Avery, Chuck Jones and Frank Tashlin further increased the quality of the studio's output. He later added Carl Stalling and Mel Blanc, and collectively these men created such famous characters as Porky Pig, Daffy Duck and Bugs Bunny. Schlesinger largely took a "hands off" approach to the animation unit, allowing his directors freedom to create what they wished, provided that the resulting films were successful. Schlesinger sold Pacific Title & Art Studio in 1935 to concentrate on his animation studio.

Business practices 
Schlesinger was known for his hard-nosed business practices. His animators worked in a dilapidated studio (Avery's unit were briefly assigned to a bungalow they dubbed "Termite Terrace"), and Schlesinger briefly shut down the studio in mid-1941 when unionized employees demanded a pay raise. On another occasion, he boycotted the Academy Awards for what he claimed was preferential treatment for the Walt Disney Cartoon Studio. He also farmed some of the Looney Tunes out to brother-in-law Ray Katz for tax breaks.

Schlesinger was also known among his animators for his lisp. One oft-repeated story states that Mel Blanc patterned the voices of both Daffy Duck and Sylvester the Cat on Schlesinger. However, in Mel Blanc's autobiography, That's Not All Folks!, he contradicts that conventional belief, writing "It seemed to me that such an extended mandible would hinder his speech, particularly on words containing an s sound. Thus 'despicable' became 'desthpicable'." Daffy's slobbery, exaggerated lisp was developed over time.

Appearances in shorts 

Leon Schlesinger appeared as himself in Freleng's short You Ought to Be in Pictures (1940), one that combines live action with animation. In this short, Mel Blanc voices Daffy Duck, Porky Pig, and all other characters, except Schlesinger, who dubbed his voice because the studio did not have a sound camera. In the film the stuttering Porky is unable to pronounce "Mr. Schlesinger," eventually giving up and addressing him as "Leon". As with other Warner cartoon staffers, Schlesinger appeared in caricature form in such cartoons as Hollywood Steps Out, Russian Rhapsody and Nutty News.

Later life and career 
Schlesinger remained head of the animation studio until 1944 when he sold his assets to Warner Bros. Eddie Selzer assumed Schlesinger's position as producer. He continued to market the characters and headed Warners's Theater Services unit. 

Schlesinger was an avid racehorse fan and was a director of the Western Harness Racing Association. 

Schlesinger died from a viral infection on Christmas Day, 1949. He is interred in the Beth Olam Mausoleum inside the Hollywood Forever Cemetery in Hollywood, California.

Notes

References

External links 

 
 

1884 births
1949 deaths
19th-century American people
20th-century American businesspeople
American animated film producers
American film production company founders
American film studio executives
American people of German-Jewish descent
Burials at Hollywood Forever Cemetery
Businesspeople from Buffalo, New York
Businesspeople from Los Angeles
Businesspeople from Pennsylvania
Businesspeople from Philadelphia
Film producers from California
Film producers from Pennsylvania
Television producers from California
Television producers from New York (state)
Warner Bros. Cartoons people
Film producers from New York (state)
American Jews